This is a list of presidents of the Senate of Gabon, who is the presiding officer of the Senate of Gabon. The Senate of Gabon was created in 1997.

The president of the Senate is the constitutional successor of the president of Gabon in case of a vacancy.

References 

Politics of Gabon
Gabon, Senate
 
Presidents of the Senate